Ronald Patrick Blazier (July 30, 1971 – December 4, 2021) was an American professional baseball pitcher, who played in Major League Baseball (MLB) for the Philadelphia Phillies (–). He threw and batted right-handed.

Blazier was signed by the Phillies as an amateur free agent, mid-way through the  season. Over the course of Blazier's brief big league career, he compiled a 4–2 win–loss record, pitching in 63 games, with an earned run average (ERA) of 5.38.

He was elected to the Blair County Sports Hall of Fame in 2008 having attended local area high school Bellwood-Antis.

Blazier had been employed as a forklift operator at PGW Industries in Tipton before his death at age 50 at his home in Bellwood, Pennsylvania, on December 4, 2021. The cause of death was not disclosed.

References

External links

1971 births
2021 deaths
Major League Baseball pitchers
Baseball players from Pennsylvania
Philadelphia Phillies players
Batavia Clippers players
Bowie Baysox players
Clearwater Phillies players
Delmarva Shorebirds players
Scranton/Wilkes-Barre Red Barons players
Spartanburg Phillies players
Sportspeople from Altoona, Pennsylvania